Gillies v Keogh CA26/88 [1989] NZCA 168; [1989] 2 NZLR 327; (1989) 5 NZFLR 549; (1989) 5 FRNZ 490 is a cited case in New Zealand regarding whether de facto relation property is in a constructive trust.

References

Court of Appeal of New Zealand cases
1989 in New Zealand law